Communist Workers Party (KAP) was a Danish Maoist political party founded in 1976 and dissolved in 1994. Members of KAP integrated into The Red-Green Alliance.

Publications
Kommunistisk Arbejderparti: The programme of the Workers' Communist Parti of Denmark, Copenhagen: Forlaget Oktober, 1977

External links
Article on KAP at leksikon.org- In Danish

Defunct communist parties in Denmark
Maoist organizations in Europe
Political parties established in 1976
1976 establishments in Denmark
Political parties disestablished in 1994
1994 disestablishments in Denmark